Cuibul salamandrelor, also known as Oil! and Oil - The Billion Dollar Fire, is a 1977 Romanian-Italian action film directed by Mircea Drăgan.

Plot
An International petroleum company called Consolidated Oil covertly sets fire to an oil well in the Sahara because the government of the North African nation won't comply with their demands. Due to the extent of the damage, oil prices rise sharply. The company's president Mr. Stewart (Ray Milland) assigns John Carter (Stuart Whitman) to deflect suspicion. However, when Carter arrives on location, a company representative hinders his efforts and implies to him that the fire was started on purpose. Consolidated Oil hires a Romanian firefighting crew with little experience in oil well fires, but the Romanian specialists team up with Carter and find proof of arson. Eventually they succeed in putting out the seven fires. Consolidated Oil tries to sabotage the firefighting but their efforts fail. The international news media exposes the conspiracy and Stewart is unmasked as one of the driving forces behind the scheme. He learns that he is to be a scapegoat and is then murdered. His secretary is not only unsurprised when she is informed of his death, but she has already written his obituary. Meanwhile, the Romanian firefighters are publicly celebrated in the unnamed Arab country.

Cast
 Stuart Whitman as John Carter
 Woody Strode as Ben
 Ray Milland as The Boss (Mr Stewart)
 Gheorghe Dinică as George Oprișan aka "Salamander"
 William Berger as Peter Mann
 Tony Kendall as Ahmed (or Tony in the German version)
 Radu Beligan as Professor Luca
 Gordon Mitchell as Joe
 Florin Piersic as Dan
 Jean Constantin as  Jean
 Paola Senatore as Diana Astor
 Valentin Plătăreanu as Ionescu
 Mircea Diaconu as Grigore

DVD release
A PAL version has been released as Fireforce (Brennendes Inferno) by a company called Elfra. It includes an English and a German-language version as well as filmographies.

References

External links
 
 

1977 films
1977 drama films
English-language Italian films
English-language Romanian films
1970s English-language films
1970s Romanian-language films
Films directed by Mircea Drăgan
Films set in the Middle East
Films about firefighting
Works about petroleum
Italian drama films
Romanian drama films
1977 multilingual films
Italian multilingual films
Romanian multilingual films
1970s Italian films